The 2015–16 NC State Wolfpack women's basketball team represents North Carolina State University during the 2015–16 NCAA Division I women's basketball season. The Wolfpack, led by third-year head coach Wes Moore, play their home games at Needham B. Broughton High School with 2 games at PNC Arena due to renovations at Reynolds Coliseum and were members of the Atlantic Coast Conference. They finished the season 20–11, 10–6 in ACC play to finish in sixth place. They advanced to the quarterfinals of the ACC women's tournament to Syracuse. Despite having 20 wins and being projected as a tournament team, they were not invited to the NCAA tournament, the team voted not to accept an invitation to the WNIT.

Roster

Media
WKNC acts as the home for Wolfpack women's basketball. Patrick Kinas and Rachel Stockdale provide the call for the games. ESPN and the ACC RSN will televise select Wolfpack games during the season. All non-televised home conference games will be shown on ESPN3 using the radio broadcasters for the call.

Schedule

|-
!colspan=9 style="background:#E00000; color:white;"| Exhibition

|-
!colspan=9 style="background:#E00000; color:white;"| Non-conference regular season

|-
!colspan=9 style="background:#E00000; color:white;"| ACC regular season

|-
!colspan=9 style="background:#E00000; color:white;"| ACC Women's Tournament

Source

Rankings

See also
2015–16 NC State Wolfpack men's basketball team

References

NC State Wolfpack women's basketball seasons
NC State
NC State Wolf
NC State Wolf